The 2018–19 UMass Minutewomen basketball team represents the University of Massachusetts Amherst  during the 2018–19 college basketball season. The Minutewomen, led by third year head coach Tory Verdi, were members of the Atlantic 10 Conference and play their home games at the William D. Mullins Memorial Center. They finished the season 16–16, 7–9 in A-10 play to finish in a 3 way tie for eighth place. They advanced to the quarterfinals of the A-10 women's tournament where they lost Duquesne.

Media
All non-televised Minutewomen home games and conference road games stream on the A-10 Digital Network. WMUA carries Minutewomen games with Mike Knittle on the call.

Roster

Schedule

|-
!colspan=9 style=| Exhibition

|-
!colspan=9 style=| Non-conference regular season

|-
!colspan=9 style=| A-10 Regular season

|-
!colspan=9 style=| Atlantic 10 Women's Tournament

Rankings
2018–19 NCAA Division I women's basketball rankings

See also
 2018–19 UMass Minutemen basketball team

References

UMass Minutewomen basketball seasons
UMass